The 2021 AFC Champions League group stage was played from 14 to 30 April 2021 for the West Region and from 22 June to 11 July 2021 for the East Region. A total of 40 teams competed in the group stage to decide the 16 places in the knockout stage of the 2021 AFC Champions League.

Draw

The draw for the group stage was held at the AFC House in Kuala Lumpur, Malaysia, on 27 January 2021. The 40 teams were drawn into ten groups of four: five groups each in the West Region (Groups A–E) and the East Region (Groups F–J). For each zone, teams were seeded into four pots and drawn into the relevant positions within each group, based on their association ranking and their seeding within their association, in consideration of technical balance between groups. Teams from the same association could not be drawn into the same group.

The following 40 teams entered into the group stage draw, which included the 32 direct entrants and the eight winners of the play-off round of the qualifying play-offs, whose identity was not known at the time of the draw.

Format

In the group stage, each group was played on a double round-robin basis in centralised venues. The winners of each group and three best runners-up from each region advanced to the round of 16 of the knockout stage.

Tiebreakers

The teams were ranked according to points (3 points for a win, 1 point for a draw, 0 points for a loss). If tied on points, tiebreakers were applied in the following order (Regulations Article 8.3):
Points in head-to-head matches among tied teams;
Goal difference in head-to-head matches among tied teams;
Goals scored in head-to-head matches among tied teams;
Away goals scored in head-to-head matches among tied teams; (not applicable since the matches were played in centralised venue)
If more than two teams were tied, and after applying all head-to-head criteria above, a subset of teams were still tied, all head-to-head criteria above were reapplied exclusively to this subset of teams;
Goal difference in all group matches;
Goals scored in all group matches;
Penalty shoot-out if only two teams playing each other in the last round of the group are tied;
Disciplinary points (yellow card = 1 point, red card as a result of two yellow cards = 3 points, direct red card = 3 points, yellow card followed by direct red card = 4 points);
Association ranking.

Schedule
The schedule of each matchday was as follows.

Centralised venues
On 11 March 2021, AFC confirmed Thailand as the hosts for the group stage, except for Group H and I. On 10 May 2021, AFC confirmed Uzbekistan as the hosts for Group H and I.
Groups A and D: Riyadh, Saudi Arabia (Prince Faisal bin Fahd Stadium, King Fhad International Stadium & King Saud University Stadium)
Group B: Sharjah, United Arab Emirates (Sharjah Stadium)
Group C: Jeddah, Saudi Arabia (Sports Hall)
Group E: Margao, India (Fatorda Stadium)
Groups F and G: Bangkok, Thailand (Rajamangala Stadium & Pathum Thani Stadium)
Groups H and I: Tashkent, Uzbekistan (Bunyodkor Stadium & Lokomotiv Stadium)
Groups J: Buriram, Thailand (Buriram Stadium)

Groups

Group A

Group B

Group C

Group D

Group E

Group F

Group G

Group H

Group I

Group J

Ranking of second-placed teams

West Region

East Region

Notes

References

External links

AFC Champions League 2021, stats.the-AFC.com

2
April 2021 sports events in Asia
May 2021 sports events in Asia
June 2021 sports events in Asia
July 2021 sports events in Asia